Leonard Schwartz (23 April 1913 – 23 November 2010) was an Australian amateur tennis player in the 1930s.

He reached the quarterfinals of the 1937 and 1938 Australian Championships. In doubles, Schwartz reached the final of the 1946 Australian Championships (partnering Max Newcombe).

Schwartz was a member of the Australian Davis Cup team in the 1938 semifinal tie against Mexico and won his singles match against Daniel Hernández.

Grand Slam finals

Doubles: 1 runner-up

References

External links
 
 
 
 Australian Open results archive

1913 births
2010 deaths
Australian male tennis players
Tennis people from South Australia
Grand Slam (tennis) champions in boys' doubles
Australian Championships (tennis) junior champions
20th-century Australian people